, son of Morohira, was kugyo or highest-ranking Japanese court noble of the Muromachi period (1336–1573). He held a regent position Kampaku from 1367 to 1369. Fuyuie was his son. His daughter married Ichijō Tsunetsugu.

References
 https://web.archive.org/web/20070927231943/http://nekhet.ddo.jp/people/japan/fstakatukasa.html#fuyumititt

1330 births
1386 deaths
Fujiwara clan
Takatsukasa family
People of Kamakura-period Japan
People of Nanboku-chō-period Japan